Candler County Courthouse is a historic county courthouse in Metter, Georgia, county seat of Candler County, Georgia. The courthouse was built in a Neoclassical style in 1921 according to designs by J.J. Baldwin. It was added to the National Register of Historic Places on September 18, 1980. It is located in Courthouse Square.

See also
National Register of Historic Places listings in Candler County, Georgia

References

External links
 

Courthouses on the National Register of Historic Places in Georgia (U.S. state)
Buildings and structures in Candler County, Georgia
County courthouses in Georgia (U.S. state)
Neoclassical architecture in Georgia (U.S. state)
Government buildings completed in 1921
National Register of Historic Places in Candler County, Georgia